Singles Collection is a compilation album by The Coral, released on 15 September 2008 in the United Kingdom on the Deltasonic label. It featured a new song "Being Somebody Else", which was released as a single on 8 September 2008.

Track listing

Personnel
The Coral
 James Skelly – vocals, guitar, producer, arrangements
 Lee Southall – guitar, backing vocals (lead vocals on "Seagulls"), producer, arrangements
 Bill Ryder-Jones – guitar, trumpet, producer, arrangements, string arrangements
 Paul Duffy – bass guitar, backing vocals, saxophone, producer, arrangements
 Nick Power – keyboards, producer, arrangements
 Ian Skelly – drums, producer, arrangements, artwork, design

Production
 Ian Broudie – producer, mixing (disc 1 tracks 1, 3, 4, 6, 7, 9, 11 & 14; disc 2 track 8)
 Adrian Utley – producer, engineer (disc 1 tracks 2 & 13; disc 2 tracks 9 & 10)
 Geoff Barrow – producer (disc 1 tracks 2 & 13; disc 2 tracks 9 & 10)
 Craig Silvey – producer, engineer (disc 1 tracks 5, 10 & 12; disc 2 track 1)
 Mike Hunter – producer, engineer, mixing (disc 1 track 8; disc 2 tracks 12 & 14)
 Dan Hulme – producer, engineer, mixing (disc 2 tracks 2–4, 6 & 7); engineer (disc 1 track 14)
 Jon Gray – engineer (disc 1 tracks 1, 3, 4, 6, 7, 9, 11; disc 2 track 8)
 Pat O'Shaughnessy – recording, mixing (disc 2 track 16)
 Dave McDonnell – recording (disc 2 track 11)
 Scott Clegg – recording (disc 2 track 18)
 Ben Booker – mixing (disc 2 track 19)
 Sean O'Hagan – string arrangements (disc 1 track 14)

Other personnel
 Kevin Power – artwork, design

Charts

References

External links
 
 
 

The Coral albums
2008 compilation albums
Deltasonic compilation albums